Peter Siebold (born 1971) is a member of the Scaled Composites astronaut team. He is their Director of Flight Operations, and was one of the test pilots for SpaceShipOne and SpaceShipTwo, the experimental spaceplanes developed by the company. On October 31, 2014, Siebold and Michael Alsbury were piloting the SpaceShipTwo VSS Enterprise on flight PF04, when the craft came apart in mid-air and then crashed, killing Alsbury and injuring Siebold.

Career
Peter Siebold, a 1990 graduate of Davis Senior High School in Davis, California, obtained his pilot's license at age 16. He has been a design engineer at Scaled Composites since 1996. Siebold holds a degree in aerospace engineering from California Polytechnic University at San Luis Obispo, from 2001.

Siebold was responsible for the simulator, navigation system, and ground control system for the SpaceShipOne project at Scaled. Although he was one of four qualified pilots for SpaceShipOne, Siebold did not pilot the craft during the flights later in 2004 to meet the requirements of the Ansari X Prize.

For his contribution to the SpaceShipOne project, Siebold, along with Mike Melvill and Brian Binnie, received the 2004 Iven C. Kincheloe Award presented by the Society of Experimental Test Pilots.

Siebold became the Director of Flight Operations at Scaled. He was the pilot who flew the White Knight Two on its maiden flight on December 21, 2008. He won the Iven C. Kincheloe Award a second time in 2009, this time individually, for his work on the first WhiteKnightTwo, VMS Eve, as chief test pilot.

SpaceShipTwo VSS Enterprise crash

On October 31, 2014, Siebold was one of the two pilots flying the Virgin Galactic SpaceShipTwo, VSS Enterprise, along with Michael Alsbury, on a test flight, which suffered an anomaly, resulting in the death of Alsbury and loss of Enterprise. VSS Enterprise crashed in the California Mojave Desert.
 He suffered from eyesight degradation and eye pains. He was unable to keep his eyes open and he did not open his right eye until emergency personnel arrived.

Siebold's flight suit was saturated with blood from bleeding in his right arm. He did not feel any lower body injuries. As Siebold removed his parachute harness a "clunking noise" was felt in his chest and Siebold became concerned about a potential spinal fracture. Upon arrival at the ER his flight suit was cut away. 

Siebold experienced a non-compound four-part fracture of his right humerus. The ball of his ankle was also dislocated and fractured. He had a non-displaced fracture of his right clavicle, a small gash in his right elbow (source of the blood on his flight suit), a deep scrape on his right wrist, and multiple scrapes on the back of his right shoulder. There was considerable bruising on his right chest but he did not know how it occurred. He did not recall any bruising on his left side. He had an abrasion under his chin which he felt was consistent with the location of his chin strap, and had multiple contusions and scrapes on his face. He was diagnosed with corneal scratches and doctors removed a piece of fiberglass from his left eye during a hospital stay. The eyes did not improve so he saw an ophthalmologist after being discharged. The ophthalmologist removed some foreign matter from his left eyelid and a "silver sliver" from his right cornea. His eyes improved immediately post procedure.

References

External links
 Scaled Composites biography 
 Biography on Encyclopedia Astronautica
 List of American Astronauts
 Report by Space.com on Siebold's successful escape from VSS Enterprise

1971 births
Living people
Scaled Composites Tier One program
Commercial astronauts
American aviators
American test pilots
Scaled Composites
Virgin Galactic
Date of birth missing (living people)
Place of birth missing (living people)
Davis Senior High School (California) alumni
People from Davis, California
California Polytechnic State University alumni